The House Subcommittee on Workforce Protections is a standing subcommittee within the United States House Committee on Education and Labor.

Jurisdiction
The Subcommittee's jurisdiction includes:

Wages and hours of workers, including but not limited to the Davis-Bacon Act, the Walsh-Healey Act, the McNamara–O'Hara Service Contract Act, and the Fair Labor Standards Act
Workers’ compensation, including but not limited to the Federal Employees' Compensation Act, the Longshore and Harbor Workers’ Compensation Act, and the Black Lung Benefits Act
The Migrant and Seasonal Agricultural Worker Protection Act
The Family and Medical Leave Act
The Worker Adjustment and Retraining Notification Act
The Employee Polygraph Protection Act of 1988
Trade, international labor rights, and immigration issues as they affect employers and workers; and workers’ safety and health, including but not limited to occupational safety and health, mine safety and health, and migrant and agricultural worker safety and health.

Members, 118th Congress

Historical membership rosters

115th Congress

116th Congress

117th Congress

References

External links
 Subcommittee page

Education Workforce Protections